The 255th (Queen's Own Rifles of Canada) Battalion, CEF was a unit in the Canadian Expeditionary Force during the First World War.  Based in Toronto, Ontario, the unit began recruiting late in 1916 from The Queen's Own Rifles of Canada, which was based in that city.  After sailing to England in June 1917, the battalion was absorbed into the 12th Reserve Battalion, CEF upon arrival.  The 255th (Queen's Own Rifles of Canada) Battalion, CEF had one Officer Commanding: Lieut-Col. G. C. Royce.

Stated place-of-birth of those who embarked for overseas with the battalion: Australia: 1; Albania: 1; Canada: 123; Channel Islands: 3; China: 1; England: 95; Galicia: 1; Ireland: 13; Italy: 1; Newfoundland: 1; Russia: 22; Scotland: 24; South America: 1; U.S.A.: 15 ; not stated: 1.

References
Meek, John F. Over the Top! The Canadian Infantry in the First World War. Orangeville, Ont.: The Author, 1971.

Battalions of the Canadian Expeditionary Force
Queen's Own Rifles of Canada
Military units and formations established in 1916
Military units and formations disestablished in 1917